Rahl Is an Air Hockey League hosted at the Rumain household.

Geb currently holds the RAHL trophy.

Carl Rahl (1812–1865), Austrian painter
Mady Rahl (1915–2009), German stage and film actress

The Sword of Truth fictional characters

Darken Rahl
Jennsen Rahl
Richard Rahl
Nathan Rahl
Oba Rahl
Panis Rahl

Gebhard